Austenia may refer to:
 Austenia (gastropod), a genus of gastropods in the family Helicarionidae
 Austenia, a genus of gastropods in the family Charopidae, synonym of Ruthvenia
 Austenia, a genus of flies in the family Tabanidae, synonym of Haematopota
 Austenia, a genus of grasshoppers in the family Acrinidae, synonym of Caryanda